Pot luck may refer to:

 Potluck, a form of group gathering, usually involving a meal
 Pot Luck (1936 film)
 L'Auberge espagnole, a 2002 film also released in Britain and Canada under the title Pot Luck
 Pot Luck (Elvis Presley album), a 1962 record album by Elvis Presley
 Pot Luck (Ramsey Lewis album), a 1963 record album by Ramsey Lewis
 Potluck (group), a hip hop duo from Humboldt County, CA
 Pot-Bouille, 1882 French novel by Émile Zola
 Pot Luck (TV series), an Australian television series broadcast in 1987

See also 
 Potlatch (disambiguation)